Helga Krapf (born Helga Marie Krapf; August 24, 1988) is a Filipino actress.

Biography

Personal life
She was born in Germany to a German father named Hans Krapf, a retired seaman and to a Filipina mother, Agnes Barcena. She has an older sister named Mary Rose. She was 10 years old when her father decided that they should leave Germany and live in the Philippines.

Career

Helga was a contestant on the first season of Star Circle Quest. She was one of the top 50 questors. Sooner she got booted. Later, she had a minor role on Spirits and did a cameo on Komiks Presents: Bampy. She was introduced as a Star Magic Talent on Super Inggo as Helga, one of the clan members. She has been a Kapamilya since and has appeared in several ABS-CBN shows.

In 2021, Krapf appeared in Alessandra de Rossi's directorial debut film My Amanda.

Filmography

Television 

|-
| 2022 || Ang Probinsyano
|| PCpt. Francine Garcia || ||
|}
|-

Film

Notes

References

External links

 Helga Krapf on SCQ

1988 births
Living people
Filipino film actresses
Filipino television actresses
German people of Filipino descent
Star Magic
Star Circle Quest participants